Jamila Abdallah Taha al-Shanti (Arabic: جميلة الشنطي; born 1955) is a member of the Palestinian Legislative Council.

Early life and education
Jamila al-Shanti was born in 1955. She holds a PhD in English language.

Career
Jamila al-Shanti is a member of Hamas and was the founder of Hamas women's organisation. She is the most senior woman among Hamas deputies elected in 2006 since she was no. 3 on its list. She is the widow of Abdel Aziz al-Rantissi, an assassinated Hamas leader. She worked as a faculty member  at the Islamic University in Gaza.

References

20th-century Palestinian women
1955 births
Hamas members
Academic staff of the Islamic University of Gaza
Living people
Members of the 2006 Palestinian Legislative Council
Palestinian Sunni Muslims
Palestinian women academics
Palestinian women in politics
21st-century Palestinian women
21st-century women politicians